Joseph Chambers (1815 – 16 July 1884) was an English-born Australian politician.

He was born in Portsmouth and worked as a solicitor before entering politics. On 25 November 1843 he married Mary Jane Way; his second marriage, on 13 October 1873, was to widow Mary Kelly.

He was elected to the New South Wales Legislative Assembly for East Maitland at the 1859 election, but his seat was declared vacant two months later on his appointment as Crown Prosecutor at Quarter Sessions, allocated to the Western District.

Chambers died at East Maitland in 1884 (aged ).

References

 

1815 births
1884 deaths
Members of the New South Wales Legislative Assembly
19th-century Australian politicians